Prirechnoye is a rural locality (a selo) and the administrative center of Prirechenskoye Rural Settlement, Verkhnemamonsky District, Voronezh Oblast, Russia. The population was 762 as of 2010. There are 8 streets.

Geography 
Prirechoye is located 10 km northeast of Verkhny Mamon (the district's administrative centre) by road. Nizhny Mamon is the nearest rural locality.

References 

Rural localities in Verkhnemamonsky District